The Merriam-Webster's Advanced Learner's English Dictionary is a dictionary that was published in 2008.

See also
 Advanced learner's dictionary

External links
 Merriam-Webster's Advanced Learner's English Dictionary online

English dictionaries
2008 non-fiction books